Arthur E. "Art" Teele Jr. (May 14, 1946 – July 27, 2005) was an American lawyer and politician from the Republican Party. In the early 1980s, he served as the head of the Urban Mass Transportation Administration (now known as the Federal Transit Administration) from 1981 to 1983.  Born into a wealthy black family in Florida, Teele received an excellent education and became an officer in the US Army, and later had a successful career in private practice and politics. The Miami Herald published claims of legal wrongdoing against Teele during his fight to have a conviction against him overturned, and he committed suicide. Posthumously, his case was appealed and his conviction was overturned, exonerating him of all charges.

Art Teele married Celestra Patton Teele, of whom he had one son Arthur Patton Teele. (Trey) Teele, later married Stephanie K. Teele of whom he was married upon his death.

Military and legal careers
Teele was a law student who went into the military after his graduation. Teele served the US Army as a Judge Advocate General on the personal staff of General Henry Emerson, Commander of the XVIII Airborne Corps at Fort Bragg from July 1975 to June 1977. Teele earned his law degree from Florida State University College of Law.

After his honorable discharge from the US Army, Teele provided pro bono services to the defendants in the Wilmington Ten which was the most prominent civil rights case in America during the 1970s. Teele met with the attorneys for the Wilmington Ten as well as attorneys and administrative staff of North Carolina Attorney General Rufus Edmisten. In 1980, the federal courts ordered a new trial for the Wilmington Ten, and Attorney General Edmisten dropped all charges after hearing appeals from Teele and others permitting the Wilmington Ten to go free.

Returning to the private practice of law in his home state of Florida, Teele became the attorney for Bill France, the founder of NASCAR, before entering politics in Miami. In Europe, Teele consulted with Interpol on investigations into organized crime and international homicide cases.

Political career
In March 1981, President Ronald Reagan appointed Teele to lead the Urban Mass Transportation Administration (UMTA), a position officially known as Administrator of UMTA (now FTA). He served as UMTA Administrator from April 1981 to June 1983.

In March 1993, Teele was elected Miami-Dade County Commissioner in Miami, Florida, serving as the Commission's chairman. He resigned from the county commission in 1996, to run for mayor of Miami-Dade County. He campaigned for Bob Dole in the 1996 presidential primaries, and this political association was raised as an issue in the African-American community during Teele's run for mayor. Teele was one of the top two candidates to emerge from the general election, but he was narrowly defeated in a runoff by Alex Penelas. In November 1997, he was elected to a four-year term as a city commissioner for the city of Miami.

Following a controversial investigation and trial, Teele was removed from office by Governor Jeb Bush on March 2, 2005. Although Teele was convicted of corruption by threat against a public servant, the verdict was overturned on appeal after his death by suicide.

Suicide and tabloid scandal
On July 27, 2005, Teele walked into the Miami Herald building and shot himself fatally in the head.

At the time of his death, Teele was a popular politician with a loyal following in Miami-Dade. Teele's conviction stemmed from an incident with a Miami-Dade County detective who had been conducting surveillance as part of a corruption probe. That probe was triggered in part by investigative articles published in the Miami Herald by journalist Oscar J. Corral. That probe had resulted in Teele being charged with ten felony counts of unlawful compensation, with trial set for October 2005. Teele was also under federal indictment for money laundering, mail fraud and wire fraud for allegedly helping a minority company win more than $20 million worth of electrical contracts at Miami International Airport for work that was actually undertaken by a larger non-minority company. Teele faced a possible 20 years in prison if convicted of the federal charges, but an examination of his personal financial records after his death revealed that Teele was not a rich man and was actually in debt for half a million dollars.

On the day of his suicide, the Miami New Times published a cover story on Teele which was based on the report of the corruption probe and detailed alleged dealings with illegal drugs and a transvestite prostitute with a criminal record. Shortly before he shot himself, Teele called Miami Herald columnist Jim DeFede, who taped their conversation. This taping led to the dismissal of DeFede. According to the tape, Teele professed his love for his wife, Stephanie, in a rambling conversation that revealed a spike in his personal anxiety.

Conviction overturned and Teele exonerated
On April 18, 2007, almost two years after he committed suicide, Teele's conviction for corruption by threat against a public servant was overturned by the Florida Third District Court of Appeal. The court allowed the appeal by a deceased individual on the basis that Teele's conviction precluded his wife from making a valid claim for death benefits under the City of Miami's pension plan and other merits of his case.

Miami Noir
A documentary about Teele's final days that concentrated on his suicide was produced by two University of Miami film students, Josh Miller and Sam Rega. Miller and Rega's student documentary, Miami Noir, was screened at the 2008 Miami International Film Festival. Their documentary re-examined the scandal in the context of political pressures from the Florida State Attorney's Office during Jeb Bush's administration that raised concerns about the motives for the persecution of Art Teele.

References

External links 
 Official Miami Noir: The Arthur E. Teele Story
 Francisco Alvarado, Tales of Teele: Sleaze Stories, Miami New Times, July 28, 2005
 MP3 of Miami Herald radio reports from inside the building immediately after Teele shot himself
 Miami television station Local 10 online news story on the event
 West Palm Beach Channel 25 online news story

2005 suicides
African-American lawyers
African-American United States Army personnel
African-American people in Florida politics
American politicians who committed suicide
County commissioners in Florida
Florida lawyers
Florida Republicans
United States Army Judge Advocate General's Corps
Suicides by firearm in Florida
United States Department of Transportation officials
1946 births
20th-century American politicians
Government of Miami
Government of Miami-Dade County, Florida
20th-century American lawyers
20th-century African-American politicians
21st-century African-American people
 Florida politicians convicted of crimes